Macroperipatus ohausi is a species of velvet worm in the Peripatidae family. Females of this species have 27 or 28 pairs of legs. The type locality is Rio de Janeiro, Brazil.

References

Further reading
 

Onychophorans of tropical America
Onychophoran species
Animals described in 1900